Ajay Kumar Singh is an Indian politician, currently a member of Rashtriya Janata Dal and a Member of Legislative Council in the Bihar Legislative Council.

References 

Year of birth missing (living people)
Living people
Members of the Bihar Legislative Council
Rashtriya Janata Dal politicians
Indian social workers